The Longshot is a 1986 American comedy film directed by Paul Bartel and starring Tim Conway.

Plot
Four friends enjoy betting on horses at the race track. Someone tells them that he's got something to give his horse to make it run faster, and they can win a lot of money if they bet. Dooley tries to romance Nicki Dixon to get the money, but he finds out she's a lunatic who tries to kill him when he reminds her of her ex. Later, they borrow an envelope of money from the mob, who expect them to pay back within a week. They find out that the man who gave them the tip was a fraud, but Dooley remembered someone saying that the horse would run fast if he saw red. He ran out to the track, waved a red dress and the horse won the race.

Cast
Tim Conway as Dooley
Harvey Korman as Lou
Jack Weston as Elton
Ted Wass as Stump
Stella Stevens as Nicki Dixon
Anne Meara as Madge
George DiCenzo as DeFranco
Jorge Cervera as Santiago
Jonathan Winters as Tyler
Frank Bonner as Realtor
Eddie Deezen as Parking Attendant
Nick Dimitri as Track Cop
Garry Goodrow as Josh
Edie McClurg as Donna
Joseph Ruskin as Fusco

References

External links
 
 
 

1986 films
1980s sports comedy films
American sports comedy films
Films directed by Paul Bartel
Films scored by Charles Fox
Films about gambling
American horse racing films
Orion Pictures films
1986 comedy films
1980s English-language films
1980s American films